Presidential elections were held in Cameroon on 11 October 1992. They were the first presidential election since multi-party politics had been legalised, and were also the first to feature more than one candidate. Incumbent Paul Biya won with 39.98% of the vote. Voter turnout was 71.9%.

Background
The 1992 presidential elections were a crucial moment in Cameroon's post-independence history. Although an assortment of opposition leaders—most importantly the anglophone Social Democratic Front leader John Fru Ndi—furiously opposed President Biya and sought to unseat him between 1990 and 1992, they were ultimately unable to do so. Although opposition was successful in forcing Biya to accept multi-party politics and severely pressured his regime, he nevertheless retained control of the country and faced a divided opposition in the 1992 elections. The opposition's failure to present a single candidate offered a significant advantage to Biya, as the electoral law did not provide for a second round, and therefore the opposition candidates could not unite against Biya in the event he failed to win a majority.

Results
Official results showed Biya winning the election with 40% of the vote, while Fru Ndi trailed with 36%. The results were denounced as fraudulent by the opposition, and Fru Ndi claimed victory, but his claim proved fruitless.

Aftermath
After the election, the opposition began a long and gradual decline in strength from which it has never recovered, while Biya began to consolidate power again.

References

Cameroon
1992 in Cameroon
Presidential elections in Cameroon
October 1992 events in Africa